John A. Kuri is a United States author and screenwriter, film and television producer, director, and production designer. He is the son of set decorator Emile Kuri, who won Academy Awards for William Wyler's The Heiress (1949) and Walt Disney's 20,000 Leagues Under the Sea (1954).

John Kuri's literary works include Takin’ It Back (2005), a sports-themed novel. It is inspired in part by the Police Athletic League, a national volunteer staffed organization of over 80,000 off-duty police officers who mentor over two million teens annually, and further inspired by Kuri's work with the L.A. Sheriff's Department when he produced and directed officer survival training films and recruitment commercials and trained at the Sheriff's Academy qualifying as a marksmen on their pistol range. Kuri's historical novel Cheyenne Rising Sun (2004) tells the parallel stories of Morning Star — the legendary chief of the Northern Cheyenne Nation and his great grandson Ted Rising Sun, a Korean War veteran and tribal leader.  The book was chosen for inclusion in the archives of the American Philosophical Society in 2018. Another sports-themed inspirational book of Kuri's is "ROD" (2008).

Kuri's career began in 1961 at Disneyland in theme park design, operations, construction and maintenance. He was one of a small number selected for the "Organizational Development" program wherein young executives in training were moved throughout the Disney company to experience all aspects of management.  Later, Kuri oversaw the interior decoration of five park attractions as well as the Golf Course Hotel at Disney World, Florida.  In 1972 he transferred to Walt Disney Studios and began his full-time motion picture and television career.  While there to early 1975 Kuri designed sets for several motion pictures including the 1975 comedy western, The Apple Dumpling Gang. That year he went independent designing sets for films including Leadbelly, a biography of the musician directed by Gordon Parks, and Report to the Commissioner, a film based on James Mills' 1972 novel, directed by Milton Katselas.

In the fall of 1975 Kuri was interviewed and hired by producer Irwin Allen at 20th Century Studios.  The studio's real estate division had acquired a lease on Marineland of the Pacific and placed the redesign and showcasing of the 21-year-old public oceanarium in Allen's studio unit.  With Kuri's Disney theme park design and operational experience he oversaw attraction redesign, new show development, and seasonally themed special attractions.  Kuri produced live concerts including Ray Charles and his orchestra, broadcast live on Long Beach Jazz station KLON-FM (later KKJZ).  Other concerts included Buddy Rich and his Big Band Machine and folk music group The Limelighters.

In 1981 Kuri was introduced to Orson Welles by cinematographer Gary Graver (he had worked with Kuri on Ron Howard’s film, The Time Crystal). Working from his Hollywood home in Laurel Canyon Welles shared sketches of his concepts for an upcoming movie he was preparing for PBS titled Heloise. Kuri was to be production designer and Graver the cinematographer. The film was to be a romantic tale of the 12th century heroine and famous lover of Peter Abelard.  Welles was fascinated with this story, one of history’s most famous romantic relationships.  While in pre-production the movie was halted as Welles’ health would not permit insurance coverage of him as the director.

In February 1990 as CEO of his then company Sheffield Entertainment, Inc., Kuri won the legal case in arbitration to the FFC license for full power television station KCMY, its antenna planned to service the Sacramento area.  Kuri secured the station's build out and operational budget with Pacific Group and negotiated an affiliate deal with Telemundo.  The station first signed on the air on August 27, 1990, as KCMY. It originally operated as the Sacramento area’s Home Shopping Club. Paxson Communications purchased the station in 1998, changing its call sign to KSPX. 
   
Kuri's filmography has over 140 screen credits including his published story of the Donner Party, One More Mountain (1994) for Disney's Wonderful World of Color and ABC Television''' for which he received the Christopher Award, the Louis L’Amour western, Conagher (1991), debuting as TNT's highest-rated two-hour drama and for which the National Cowboy Hall of Fame awarded Kuri their Western Heritage Award, also he co-wrote and produced the MGM release starring Pat Morita Captive Hearts (1987). Then Kuri created the ABC series Ohara for Warner Bros Television starring Pat Morita (1987) and in 1973 he was Emmy-nominated as art director and set decorator of John Steinbeck's The Red Pony.

September 2008 Kuri was asked to have several meetings with Jiao Hongfen (Chinese: 姣轰纷), Vice Chairman of China Film Group (CFGC) and key executives Jiao brought from China for a series of mentoring sessions in Los Angeles. CFGC is the largest, most influential film enterprise in the People's Republic of China, controlling import of all film, and is China's largest film distributor. The meetings led to Kuri proposing a bio-pic on "Jenny" Lang Ping (Chinese: 郎平), the Chinese volleyball star player nicknamed “Iron Hammer” for her thunderous spikes. She won the most valuable player award in women's volleyball at the 1984 Olympics when her team defeated Team USA in Los Angeles. Jiao arranged for Kuri to meet and interview Lang Ping who at the time was coaching the U.S. Women's Olympic volleyball team. Kuri proposed Chinese actress Gong Li (Chinese: 巩俐) to star as Lang Ping. In 2020 the film was released by CFGC under the title Leap. In 2009 Kuri approached the Newport Beach Film Festival to arrange the North American premieres of three motion pictures from the CFGC, including the successful title Looking for Jackie Chan, for the 2010 edition of the festival. The premieres were an extended part of China Festival in Orange County.

At the suggestion of Dr. Andy Walshe, (Ph.D. in Applied Biomechanics — who prepared Felix Baumgartner for his jump from the edge of space as a sport, and has worked with the US Olympic Ski and Snowboard teams developing their athletes) Kuri was one of the initial participants in the Red Bull High Performance “Hacking Creativity” project in 2015. Hacking Creativity is an exploration of human potential studying what creativity is, means, if it can be learned, and how to apply such knowledge.

A member of the Academy of Motion Picture Arts and Sciences, Kuri was nominated to the Academy's Board of Governors in June, 2022. He is a member of the Directors Guild of America, Writers Guild of America, and Art Directors Guild. He is active in digital media and is the founder of a video portal staytunedtv.

Kuri was a Senior Fellow with the Culture of Lawfulness Project for the National Strategy Information Center (NSIC), a Washington, DC based education and research foundation. Throughout the Middle East and Persian Gulf regions, South America, and Mexico, Kuri spoke at NSIC hosted conferences, mentored participants in workshops and held remote followup sessions on the workshop assignments.  The success of the Culture of Lawfulness program is noted by Paula J. Dobriansky, Under Secretary of State for Global Affairs, in her report cited below in "References" footnote 26.  Also resulting from this work Kuri wrote the foreword to the 2013 book "Separation of Powers & The Rule of Law, the Lebanese System" from Dr. Akl M. Kairouz and Dr. Issam Y. Atala, professors at Université La Sagesse, Beirut. Continuing his efforts in that region Kuri was invited to speak at The Conference for Reclaiming Neutrality in Lebanon held at Beit Anya, Lebanon on April 23, 2022. On May 15, 2022 Hezbollah suffered defeat in Lebanon’s parliamentary election, losing not only its majority control of the legislature but also all of its non-Shia-Muslim allies. The people voted for change, choosing reforms over Hezbollah and its military arsenal.

A graduate of Army Navy Academy, Kuri won the William Randolph Hearst national rifle marksmanship team championship in 1961. A commercial pilot Kuri has directed aviation sequences for movies and television and, as he did for Ron Howard's Skyward starring Bette Davis and the hit series Airwolf, he flew the camera plane. NYT critic John J. O'Connor wrote, "The real star of Skyward Christmas (The Skyward'' sequel) is John A. Kuri, who is in charge of the aerial photography. The scenes of the small planes in flight are swoopingly beautiful..."

Kuri's avocation is jazz guitar with a specific interest in Brazilian rhythms — bossa nova and samba. He has performed in L.A. jazz clubs as a member of the Stephen Boyd Quartet and as the leader of his sextet, John Kuri's Elixir and Friends.

References

External links 
 The New York Times-- Movies & TV (John A Kuri)
 Turner Classic Movies-- Filmography (John A Kuri)
 Filmography for Elixir Founder John Kuri
 
 History of Elixir Entertainment and its sister corporation Kuri Productions

21st-century American novelists
American male novelists
American television producers
Living people
Businesspeople from California
21st-century American male writers
Year of birth missing (living people)